The women's team sprint race of the 2015–16 ISU Speed Skating World Cup 2, arranged in the Utah Olympic Oval, in Salt Lake City, United States, was held on November 22, 2015.

The Chinese team won the race on a new world record, while the Russian team came second, and the Japanese team came third. All three teams beat the old record, which was held by the Japanese team, and established only the previous weekend.

Results
The race took place on Sunday, November 22, in the afternoon session, scheduled at 15:30.

Note: WR = world record, NR = national record.

References

Women team sprint
2
ISU